Ayushman Bhava is an Indian television series which aired on STAR Bharat. The series stars Avinash Sachdev and Sumit Bhardwaj.

Plot
Set in present-day Mathura, Krish Mehra (Ricky Patel / Sumit Bhardwaj) is the troubled son of Madhav and Sudha Mehra who grows up recalling his past life when he was Avinash Dubey (Avinash Sachdev), a software engineer who was betrayed and killed by his best friend, girlfriend, and boss. The story is about Krish and how he takes his revenge on those who killed him in his past life.

Cast
 Avinash Sachdev as Avinash Dubey: Kailashnath and Kaushalya's son; Pragati's younger brother;Samaira's former boyfriend; Sudheer's former friend; Krish's past life (Dead)
 Ricky Patel as Child Krishna "Krish" Mehra
 Sumit Bhardwaj as Krishna "Krish" Mehra: Madhav and Sudha's son;Kavya's husband;Avinash's reincarnation
 Megha Gupta / Kajal Jain as Samaira Singhania: Gayatri's daughter; Vikrant's wife; Kavya's step-mother;Avinash's former girlfriend
 Manish Goel as Vikrant Singhania:Mai's son;Babli's brother; Samaira's husband; Kavya's father; one of Avinash's murderers
 Tisha Kapoor as Kavya “Gungun” Mehra (née Singhania) : Vikrant's daughter; Samaira's step-daughter;Mai's granddaughter; Krish's wife
 Sudha Chandran as Mrs. Singhania / Mai: Vikrant and Babli's mother;Kavya's grandmother
 Kapil Srivastav as Sudheer Mathur: Babli's husband;Avinash's former friend; One of Avinash's murderers
 Urmimala Sinha Roy as Babli Mathur (née Singhania) : Vikrant's sister; Mai's daughter; Sudheer's wife 
 Mahesh Badal as Badri Narayan
 Krishna Shetty as Rudra: Avinash's former friend;one of Avinash's murderers
 Shahab Khan as Kailashnath Dubey
 Savita Prabhune as Kaushalya Dubey
 Sayaji Shinde as Sub-Inspector Govind Mathre: One of Avinash's murderers (dead) 
 Sameer Sharma as Kartik: Avinash's former boss; One of Avinash's murderers
 Yogesh Mahajan as Madhav Mehra: Sudha's husband; Krish's father (dead) 
 Priya Marathe as Sudha Mehra: Madhav's wife; Krish's mother (dead) 
 Aruna Sangal as Gayatri: Samaira's mother 
 Sarita Joshi as Payal
 Gaurav K. Jha as Jassi
 Ahmad Harhash as Raj Jha

References

External links 
 Ayushman Bhava on Hotstar

2017 Indian television series debuts
2017 Indian television series endings
Hindi-language television shows
Indian television soap operas
Indian drama television series
Television shows set in Mumbai
Life OK original programming
Star Bharat original programming
Television shows set in Uttar Pradesh